Lesueurigobius is a genus of gobies native to the eastern Atlantic Ocean. The generic name honours the French naturalist Charles Alexandre Lesueur (1778-1846), for whom the type species, Lesueurigobius suerii, was named, Georg Duncker's name Lesueuria being preoccupied by a genus of comb jellies.

Species
There are currently five recognized species in this genus:
 Lesueurigobius friesii (Malm, 1874) (Fries's goby)
 Lesueurigobius heterofasciatus Maul, 1971
 Lesueurigobius koumansi (Norman, 1935)
 Lesueurigobius sanzi (F. de Buen, 1918) (Sanzo's goby)
 Lesueurigobius suerii (A. Risso, 1810) (Lesueur's goby)

References

 
Gobiinae